The Inter Godfather's, previously known as Fiesta Inter Saipan, was a M*League Division 1 football club based in Garapan on the island of Saipan, which is a part of the United States Commonwealth of the Northern Mariana Islands (CNMI).  The club has won five titles in the Northern Mariana Championships between 2007 and 2011.

Honors

References

Football clubs in the Northern Mariana Islands